Héctor Gutiérrez Ruiz (1934, Montevideo – May 20, 1976, Buenos Aires) was a Uruguayan political figure, who died by assassination in the framework of Operation Condor. He was married to Matilde Rodriguez Larreta and had five children: Marcos, Juan Pablo, Magdalena, Facundo and Mateo.

Background and political role

He served as a Uruguayan deputy, and was member of the National Party. He was President of the Chamber of Deputies at the time of the coup d'état in 1973, after which he exiled himself in Argentina.

Assassination and prosecution file

Héctor Gutiérrez was abducted on 18 May 1976 by a paramilitary group. He was tortured and shot; his body was discovered on 21 May in an abandoned Torino sedan, at the corner of Perito Moreno and Dellepiane in Buenos Aires. Three other bodies were found in the car – Zelmar Michelini, former senator, and two Tupamaros militants, William Whitelaw and Rosario del Carmen Barredo, all of whom had also been tortured before they were killed.

Judge Roberto Timbal put former dictator Juan María Bordaberry and former Foreign Minister Juan Carlos Blanco Estradé under preventive detention on 16 November 2006, for having orchestrated the murders. Uruguayan police officer Hugo Campos has also been suspected of being responsible.

References 

1934 births
1976 deaths
Politicians from Montevideo
People killed in Operation Condor
Uruguayan expatriates in Argentina
Assassinated Uruguayan politicians
Uruguayan people of Spanish descent
Uruguayan people murdered abroad
People murdered in Argentina
Deaths by firearm in Argentina
National Party (Uruguay) politicians
Presidents of the Chamber of Representatives of Uruguay